North Korea competed as the Democratic People's Republic of Korea at the 1984 Winter Olympics in Sarajevo, Yugoslavia.

Speed skating

Men

Women

References
Official Olympic Reports
 Olympic Winter Games 1984, full results by sports-reference.com

Korea, North
1984
1984 in North Korean sport